Reichenberg may refer to:

Places
Reichenberg, the German name for Liberec, a city in the Czech Republic
Reichenberg, Rhineland-Palatinate, a municipality in Rhineland-Palatinate, Germany
Reichenberg, Bavaria, a municipality in Bavaria, Germany

Other
Fieseler Fi 103R (Reichenberg), a World War II German aircraft.